Archduke Wilhelm Franz Karl of Austria-Teschen (German: Erzherzog Wilhelm Franz Karl von Habsburg-Lothringen, 21 April 1827 – 29 April 1894) was an Archduke of Austria from the House of Habsburg.

He was born in Vienna as the son of Archduke Charles, Duke of Teschen (1771–1847) and Princess Henrietta of Nassau-Weilburg (1797–1829). He was a grandson of Leopold II (1747–1792) and nephew of Franz II (1768–1835), the last two Holy Roman Emperors.

He studied political sciences at the University of Vienna and he was a student of Joseph von Kudler.
 
He held the office of Grand Master of the Teutonic Knights from 1863 until his death in 1894. He gained the rank of Feldzeugmeister in the service of the Austrian Army in January 1867, after commanding the artillery and being wounded at the Battle of Königgrätz (1866). He was Governor of the Federal Fortress of Mainz.

Archduke Wilhelm of Austria died unmarried and without issue on 29 July 1894 in Weikersdorf after falling from a horse. He had been riding in Baden when his horse was frightened by a motor car. The horse bolted, and the Archduke was thrown. One of his feet remained stuck in the stirrup, and he was dragged more than 100 yards. He died without regaining consciousness. His death was attributed to a concussion on the brain. The archduke was 67 years old.

Ancestry

Further reading
 Constantin von Wurzbach: Habsburg, Wilhelm Franz Karl. In: Biographisches Lexikon des Kaiserthums Oesterreich. 7. Theil. Kaiserlich-königliche Hof- und Staatsdruckerei, Wien 1861, pp. 155.
 Oscar Criste: Wilhelm (Erzherzog von Österreich). In: Allgemeine Deutsche Biographie (ADB). Vol.55, Duncker & Humblot, Leipzig 1910, p. 91–93.
 Antonio Schmidt-Brentano: Die k. k. bzw. k. u. k. Generalität 1816–1918, österreichisches Staatsarchiv
 Johannes Ressel: Kirchen und Kapellen, religiöse Gedenksäulen und Wegzeichen in Baden bei Wien. Ein Beitrag zur Geschichte, Heimatkunde und Kunstgeschichte. 2., verbesserte und erweiterte Auflage. Grasl, Baden 1982, .

External links

 Bio on Wikisource (German)

1827 births
1894 deaths
Nobility from Vienna
House of Habsburg-Lorraine
Grand Masters of the Teutonic Order
People of the Austro-Prussian War
Deaths by horse-riding accident in Austria
Austrian princes
Burials at the Imperial Crypt